James Branch is a stream in the U.S. state of Missouri. It is a tributary of Huzzah Creek.

James Branch was also called Jim's Branch, but the namesake of the name is unknown.

See also
List of rivers of Missouri

References

Rivers of Crawford County, Missouri
Rivers of Missouri